Prevail II is the fifth studio album from Canadian heavy metal band Kobra and the Lotus.  Released on 27 April 2018, the work was published through Napalm Records.  In early 2018, the band toured alongside American red dirt metal ensemble Texas Hippie Coalition.

Track listing

Personnel 
Kobra Paige - lead vocals
Jasio Kulakowski - lead/rhythm guitars
Brad Kennedy - bass
Jurek James - lead/rhythm guitars
Marcus Lee - drums

Awards and nominations

References 

2018 albums
Kobra and the Lotus albums
Napalm Records albums